Beverly Buhr (born July 16, 1941) is an American speed skater. She competed in the women's 3000 metres at the 1960 Winter Olympics.

References

External links
 

1941 births
Living people
American female speed skaters
Olympic speed skaters of the United States
Speed skaters at the 1960 Winter Olympics
Sportspeople from Evanston, Illinois
21st-century American women